Verbo is a Spanish dark fantasy thriller film written and directed by Eduardo Chapero-Jackson.

Plot
A 15-year-old, Sara, lives with an apparently normal suburban family. She develops a sixth sense and begins to perceive a series of disturbing messages and clues, which prompt her to enter a dangerous and frightening dimension in order to save a life. In the course of this adventure to a dark parallel universe, Sara must change the world.

Cast
 Alba García as Sara
 Miguel Ángel Silvestre as Lírico
 Najwa Nimri as Inés
 Macarena Gómez as Prosak
 Verónica Echegui as Medussa
 Nasser Saleh as Darío
 Adam Jeziersky as Foco
 Manolo Solo as Professor
 Fernando Soto as Rafa
 Víctor Clavijo as Tótem
 Michelle Asante as Night
 Peter Peralta	as Japanese Teenager
 Djédjé Apali as Hermes
 Sergio Villalba as Hugo

Production
Apaches Entertainment and Telecinco Cinema co-produced the thriller film for Filmax. Alba García and Miguel Angel Silvestre play the leads. It is directed by the producer of The Others, Eduardo Chapero-Jackson.

Release
The release was originally set for the late 2010, but was delayed.  It is currently scheduled for a November 4, 2011 release after being screened at the San Sebastian Film Festival.

See also 
 List of Spanish films of 2011

References

External links
 

2011 films
2010s Spanish-language films
2010s mystery films
Films set in Spain
2011 psychological thriller films
Spanish thriller films
Spanish dark fantasy films
2010s Spanish films
Telecinco Cinema films